The women's tournament of Ice hockey at the 2007 Asian Winter Games at Changchun, China, was held from 28 January to 3 February 2007.

Squads

Results
All times are China Standard Time (UTC+08:00)

Final standing

References

External links
Official website

Women